Rene "Coach P" Plasencia (born January 8, 1973) is an American Republican politician who currently serves as a member of the Florida House of Representatives, representing the 50th District (including southeast Orange County and the northern portion of Brevard County) from 2016 to 2022. He previously was elected in the 49th District in 2014, in Orange County.

Plasencia was born and raised in Orlando, Florida. After teaching at Colonial High School, he ran for Florida State House of Representatives in 2014.

Personal life

Early life 
Rene Plasencia was born on January 8, 1973, to a Puerto Rican mother and a Cuban-native father, in Orlando, Florida, and attended Dr. Phillips High School and then the University of Central Florida, where he started the first student-athlete advisory board. In 1996, he graduated with his bachelor's degree in psychology, and then began working as a government teacher for 15 years at Colonial High School. While Plasencia taught at Colonial, he became a track and cross-country coach where he had received the nickname "Coach P."

Professional career 
In May 2021, Plasencia became the Executive Director of the Florida Veterinary Medical Association, an association that lobbies on behalf of the nearly 6,000 state licensed veterinarians and their staffs. He left that position after only five months.

Florida House of Representatives

Florida House of Representatives, District 49 

In 2014, incumbent State Representative Joe Saunders, a Democrat, ran for re-election in the 49th District, so Plasencia ran against him. He faced Ed Rodriguez, a retired police detective, in the Republican primary. Plasencia campaigned on his opposition to the Common Core Standards and standardized tests, saying, "We need to give teachers the ability to teach. A lot of what we do is almost clerical work." He ended up defeating Rodriguez in a landslide, winning the primary with 77% of the vote and advancing to the general election, where he faced Saunders. Plasencia argued that raising the minimum wage to $10.10 an hour, which Saunders supported, was a "jobs killer," and praised Governor Rick Scott on "gun rights, economics, taxes, and pro-growth strategies," while also emphasizing that he supported public education. The Orlando Sentinel, while praising Plasencia as a "passionate advocate for education," endorsed Saunders, noting that "public schools already have a champion in Saunders." Ultimately, however, Plasencia defeated Saunders by just seven hundred votes, winning his first term in the legislature with 51% of the vote.

Florida House of Representatives, District 50 
In November 2016, Plasencia was elected as a representative for the 50th district after defeating Democratic candidate Sean Ashby, and succeeding after Republican State representative Tom Goodson, following his term in the 49th District.

Following 2020, Plasencia won against Democratic candidate Nina Yoakum, a full-time substitute teacher, for reelection of the 50th district. Plasencia won by having 57.2% of the votes.

Political positions 
Rene Plasencia is a  Republican conservative.

Economy 
Plasencia is a current member of the Florida Commerce Committee since 2018. He was also appointed as chair to serve in the Florida Workforce Development & Tourism Subcommittee. Plasencia has also pushed towards the Competitive Workforce Act which prevents gender discrimination in the workforce.

Gun control 
During his time in the 49th District, Plasencia defended for 2nd Amendment Rights and had previously received an "A" rating from the National Rifle Association. After the Stoneman Douglas High School Shooting in Parkland, Florida, Plasencia voted for the Florida Senate Bill 7026, along with other Republicans, to ban bump stocks and to raise the minimum age from 18 to 21 to purchase firearms. As of 2018 Plasencia holds a "C" rating from the National Rifle Association.

Electoral history

Florida House District 49, 2014-2016

Florida House District 50, 2016-present

2016 Elections

2018 Elections

See also 

Florida House of Representatives
 Project Lead the Way

Notes

References

External links

Official 
Florida House of Representatives
Florida House of Representatives - Rene Plasencia
Rene Plasencia for State Representative
Map of Florida District 50

Other 
Appearances on C-SPAN
Profile on Vote Smart 
Latino Leadership Inc.

Republican Party members of the Florida House of Representatives
1973 births
Living people
People from Orlando, Florida
People from Orange County, Florida
University of Central Florida alumni
21st-century American politicians
Dr. Phillips High School alumni
Schoolteachers from Florida
Hispanic and Latino American teachers
Colonial High School Faculty
American politicians of Cuban descent
Puerto Rican people in Florida politics